The Age of Discovery or the Age of Exploration, part of the early modern period and largely overlapping with the Age of Sail, was a period from approximately the 15th century to the 17th century in European history, during which seafaring Europeans explored, colonized, and conquered regions across the globe.

The extensive overseas exploration, with the Portuguese and Spanish at the forefront, later joined by the Dutch, English, and French, emerged as a powerful factor in European culture, most notably the European colonization of the Americas. It also marks an increased adoption of colonialism as a government policy in several European states. As such, it is sometimes synonymous with the first wave of European colonization.

European exploration outside the Mediterranean started with the maritime expeditions of Portugal to the Canary Islands in 1336, and later with the Portuguese discoveries of the Atlantic archipelagos of Madeira and Azores, the coast of West Africa in 1434, and the establishment of the sea route to India in 1498 by Vasco da Gama, which initiated the Portuguese maritime and trade presence in Kerala and the Indian Ocean.

A main event in the Age of Discovery took place when Spain made the transatlantic voyages of Christopher Columbus between 1492 and 1504, which saw the beginning of the colonization of the Americas. Years later, the Spanish Magellan expedition made the first circumnavigation of the globe between 1519 and 1522, which was regarded as a major achievement in seamanship, and had a significant impact on the European understanding of the world. These discoveries led to numerous naval expeditions across the Atlantic, Indian, and Pacific Oceans, and land expeditions in the Americas, Asia, Africa, and Australia that continued into the late 19th century, followed by the exploration of the polar regions in the 20th century.

European overseas exploration led to the rise of international trade and the European colonial empires, with the contact between the Old World (Europe, Asia, and Africa) and the New World (the Americas), as well as Australia, producing the Columbian exchange, a wide transfer of plants, animals, food, human populations (including slaves), communicable diseases, and culture between the Eastern and Western Hemispheres. The Age of Discovery and later European exploration allowed the mapping of the world, resulting in a new worldview and distant civilizations coming into contact. At the same time, new diseases were propagated, decimating populations not previously in contact with the Old World, particularly concerning Native Americans. The era saw the widespread enslavement, exploitation and military conquest of native populations concurrent with the growing economic influence and spread of European culture and technology.

Concept 

The concept of discovery has been scrutinized, critically highlighting the history of the core term of this periodization. The term "age of discovery" has been in the historical literature and still commonly used. J. H. Parry, calling the period alternatively the Age of Reconnaissance, argues that not only was the era one of European explorations to regions heretofore unknown to them but that it also produced the expansion of geographical knowledge and empirical science. "It saw also the first major victories of empirical inquiry over authority, the beginnings of that close association of science, technology, and everyday work which is an essential characteristic of the modern western world." Anthony Pagden draws on the work of Edmundo O'Gorman for the statement that "For all Europeans, the events of October 1492 constituted a 'discovery'. Something of which they had no prior knowledge had suddenly presented itself to their gaze." O'Gorman argues further that the physical and geographical encounter with new territories was less important than the Europeans’ effort to integrate this new knowledge into their worldview, what he calls "the invention of America". Pagden examines the origins of the terms "discovery" and "invention". In English, "discovery" and its forms in the romance languages derive from "disco-operio, meaning to uncover, to reveal, to expose to the gaze” with the implicit idea that what was revealed existed previously. Few Europeans during the period of explorations used the term "invention" for the European encounters, with the notable exception of Martin Waldseemüller, whose map first used the term "America". 

A central legal concept of the Discovery Doctrine, expounded by the United States Supreme Court in 1823, draws on assertions of European powers' right to claim land during their explorations.  The concept of "discovery" been used to enforce colonial claiming and the age of discovery, but has been also vocally challenged by indigenous peoples and researchers. Many indigenous peoples have fundamentally challenged the concept and colonial claiming of "discovery" over their lands and people as forced and negating indigenous presence.

The period alternatively called the Age of Exploration, has also been scrutinized through reflections on the understanding and use of exploration. Its understanding and use, like science more generally, has been discussed as being framed and used for colonial ventures, discrimination and exploitation, by combining it with concepts such as the "frontier" (as in frontierism) and manifest destiny, up to the contemporary age of space exploration.

Alternatively, the term and concept of contact, as in first contact, has been used to shed a more nuanced and reciprocal light on the age of discovery and colonialism, using the alternative names of Age of Contact or Contact Period, discussing it as an "unfinished, diverse project".

Overview
The Portuguese began systematically exploring the Atlantic coast of Africa in 1418, under the sponsorship of Infante Dom Henrique (Prince Henry). In 1488, Bartolomeu Dias reached the Indian Ocean by this route.

In 1492, the Catholic Monarchs of Castile and Aragon funded Genoese mariner Christopher Columbus's plan to sail west to reach the Indies by crossing the Atlantic. Columbus encountered a continent uncharted by most Europeans (though it had begun to be explored and was temporarily colonized by the Norse starting some 500 years earlier). Later, it was called America after Amerigo Vespucci, a trader working for Portugal. Portugal quickly claimed those lands under the terms of the Treaty of Alcáçovas but Castile was able to persuade the Pope, who was himself a Castilian, to issue four papal bulls to divide the world into two regions of exploration, where each kingdom had exclusive rights to claim newly discovered lands. These were modified by the Treaty of Tordesillas, ratified by Pope Julius II.

In 1498, a Portuguese expedition commanded by Vasco da Gama reached India by sailing around Africa, opening up direct trade with Asia. While other exploratory fleets were sent from Portugal to northern North America, in the following years Portuguese India Armadas also extended this Eastern oceanic route, touching sometimes South America and by this way opening a circuit from the New World to Asia (starting in 1500, under the command of Pedro Álvares Cabral), and explored islands in the South Atlantic and Southern Indian Oceans. Soon, the Portuguese sailed further eastward, to the valuable Spice Islands in 1512, landing in China one year later. Japan was reached by the Portuguese only in 1543. In 1513, Spanish Vasco Núñez de Balboa crossed the Isthmus of Panama and reached the "other sea" from the New World. Thus, Europe first received news of the eastern and western Pacific within a one-year span around 1512. East and west exploration overlapped in 1522, when a Castilian (Spanish) expedition, led by Portuguese navigator Ferdinand Magellan and, after his death in the Maluku islands, by Spanish Basque navigator Juan Sebastián Elcano, sailing westward, completed the first circumnavigation of the world, while Spanish conquistadors explored the interior of the Americas, and later, some of the South Pacific islands. The main objective of this voyage was to disrupt Portuguese trade in the East.

Since 1495, the French, the English, and the Dutch entered the race of exploration after learning of these exploits, defying the Iberian monopoly on maritime trade by searching for new routes, first to the western coasts of North and South America, through the first English and French expeditions (starting with the first expedition of John Cabot in 1497 to the north, in the service of England, followed by the French expeditions to South America and later to North America), and into the Pacific Ocean around South America, but eventually by following the Portuguese around Africa into the Indian Ocean; discovering Australia in 1606, New Zealand in 1642, and Hawaii in 1778. Meanwhile, from the 1580s to the 1640s, Russians explored and conquered almost the whole of Siberia and Alaska in the 1730s.

Background

Rise of European trade
After the fall of Rome largely severed the connection between Europe and lands further east, Christian Europe was largely a backwater compared to the Arab world, which quickly conquered and incorporated large territories in the Middle East and North Africa. The Christian crusades to retake the Holy Land from the Muslims was not a military success, but it did bring Europe into contact with the Middle East and the valuable goods manufactured or traded there. From the 12th century, the European economy was transformed by the interconnecting of river and sea trade routes, leading Europe to create trading networks.

Before the 12th century, a major obstacle to trade east of the Strait of Gibraltar, which divided the Mediterranean Sea from the Atlantic Ocean, was Muslim control of great swaths of territory, including the Iberian peninsula and the trade monopolies of Christian city-states on the Italian peninsula, especially Venice and Genoa. Economic growth of Iberia followed the Christian reconquest of Al-Andalus in what is now southern Spain and the Siege of Lisbon (1147 AD), in Portugal. The decline of Fatimid Caliphate naval strength that started before the First Crusade helped the maritime Italian states, mainly Venice, Genoa and Pisa, dominate trade in the eastern Mediterranean, with merchants there becoming wealthy and politically influential. Further changing the mercantile situation in the Eastern Mediterranean was the waning of Christian Byzantine naval power following the death of Emperor Manuel I Komnenos in 1180, whose dynasty had made several notable treaties and concessions with Italian traders, permitting the use of Byzantine Christian ports. The Norman Conquest of England in the late 11th century allowed for peaceful trade on the North Sea. The Hanseatic League, a confederation of merchant guilds and their towns in northern Germany along the North Sea and Baltic Sea, was instrumental in commercial development of the region. In the 12th century, the regions of Flanders, Hainault, and Brabant produced the finest quality textiles in Northwestern Europe, which encouraged merchants from Genoa and Venice to sail there directly from the Mediterranean through the Strait of Gibraltar and up the Atlantic coast. Nicolòzzo Spinola made the first recorded direct voyage from Genoa to Flanders in 1277.

Technology: Ship design and the compass
Technological advancements that were important to the Age of Exploration were the adoption of the magnetic compass and advances in ship design.

The compass was an addition to the ancient method of navigation based on sightings of the sun and stars.  The compass had been used for navigation in China by the 11th century and was adopted by the Arab traders in the Indian Ocean. The compass spread to Europe by the late 12th or early 13th century.  Use of the compass for navigation in the Indian Ocean was first mentioned in 1232. The first mention of use of the compass in Europe was in 1180.  The Europeans used a "dry" compass, with a needle on a pivot.  The compass card was also a European invention.

The Javanese built ocean going merchant ships called po since at least the 1st century AD. It was over 50 m in length and had a freeboard of 5.2–7.8 m. The po was capable of carrying 700 people together with more than 10,000 hú (斛) of cargo (250–1000 tons according to various interpretations). They are built with multiple planks to resist storms, and had 4 sails plus a bowsprit sail.

Ships grew in size, required smaller crews and were able to sail longer distances without stopping. This led to significant lower long-distance shipping costs by the 14th century. Cogs remained popular for trade because of their low cost. Galleys were also used in trade.

Early geographical knowledge and maps
The Periplus of the Erythraean Sea, a document dating from 40 to 60 AD, describes a newly discovered route through the Red Sea to India, with descriptions of the markets in towns around Red Sea, Persian Gulf and the Indian Ocean, including along the eastern coast of Africa, which states "for beyond these places the unexplored ocean curves around toward the west, and running along by the regions to the south of Aethiopia and Libya and Africa, it mingles with the western sea (possible reference to the Atlantic Ocean)".  European medieval knowledge about Asia beyond the reach of the Byzantine Empire was sourced in partial reports, often obscured by legends, dating back from the time of the conquests of Alexander the Great and his successors.
Another source was the Radhanite Jewish trade networks of merchants established as go-betweens between Europe and the Muslim world during the time of the Crusader states.

In 1154, the Arab geographer Muhammad al-Idrisi created a description of the world and a world map, the Tabula Rogeriana, at the court of King Roger II of Sicily, but still Africa was only partially known to either Christians, Genoese and Venetians, or the Arab seamen, and its southern extent unknown. There were reports of great African Sahara, but the factual knowledge was limited for the Europeans to the Mediterranean coasts and little else since the Arab blockade of North Africa precluded exploration inland. Knowledge about the Atlantic African coast was fragmented and derived mainly from old Greek and Roman maps based on Carthaginian knowledge, including the time of Roman exploration of Mauritania. The Red Sea was barely known and only trade links with the Maritime republics, the Republic of Venice especially, fostered collection of accurate maritime knowledge.

Indian Ocean trade routes were sailed by Arab traders. Between 1405 and 1421, the Yongle Emperor of Ming China sponsored a series of long range tributary missions under the command of Zheng He (Cheng Ho). The fleets visited Arabia, East Africa, India, Maritime Southeast Asia and Thailand. But the journeys, reported by Ma Huan, a Muslim voyager and translator, were halted abruptly after the emperor's death and were not followed up, as the Chinese Ming dynasty retreated in the haijin, a policy of isolationism, having limited maritime trade.

By 1400, a Latin translation of Ptolemy's Geographia reached Italy coming from Constantinople. The rediscovery of Roman geographical knowledge was a revelation, both for map-making and worldview, although reinforcing the idea that the Indian Ocean was landlocked.

Medieval European travel (1241–1438) 

A prelude to the Age of Discovery was a series of European expeditions crossing Eurasia by land in the late Middle Ages. The Mongols had threatened Europe, but Mongol states also unified much of Eurasia and, from 1206 on, the Pax Mongolica allowed safe trade routes and communication lines stretching from the Middle East to China. A series of Europeans took advantage of these to explore eastwards. Most were Italians, as trade between Europe and the Middle East was controlled mainly by the Maritime republics. The close Italian links to the Levant raised great curiosity and commercial interest in countries which lay further east.

There are a few accounts of merchants from North Africa and the Mediterranean region who traded in the Indian Ocean in late medieval times.

Christian embassies were sent as far as Karakorum during the Mongol invasions of the Levant, from which they gained a greater understanding of the world. The first of these travellers was Giovanni da Pian del Carpine, dispatched by Pope Innocent IV to the Great Khan, who journeyed to Mongolia and back from 1241 to 1247. About the same time, Russian prince Yaroslav of Vladimir, and subsequently his sons Alexander Nevsky and Andrey II of Vladimir, travelled to the Mongolian capital. Though having strong political implications, their journeys left no detailed accounts. Other travellers followed, like French André de Longjumeau and Flemish William of Rubruck, who reached China through Central Asia. Marco Polo, a Venetian merchant, dictated an account of journeys throughout Asia from 1271 to 1295, describing being a guest at the Yuan dynasty court of Kublai Khan in Travels, and it was read throughout Europe.

The Muslim fleet guarding the Strait of Gibraltar was defeated by Genoa in 1291. In that year, the Genoese attempted their first Atlantic exploration attempt when merchant brothers Vadino and Ugolino Vivaldi sailed from Genoa with two galleys but disappeared off the Moroccan coast, feeding the fears of oceanic travel. From 1325 to 1354, a Moroccan scholar from Tangier, Ibn Battuta, journeyed through North Africa, the Sahara desert, West Africa, Southern Europe, Eastern Europe, the Horn of Africa, the Middle East and Asia, having reached China. After returning, he dictated an account of his journeys to a scholar he met in Granada, The Rihla ("The Journey"), the unheralded source on his adventures. Between 1357 and 1371 a book of supposed travels compiled by John Mandeville acquired extraordinary popularity. Despite the unreliable and often fantastical nature of its accounts it was used as a reference for the East, Egypt, and the Levant in general, asserting the old belief that Jerusalem was the centre of the world.

Following the period of Timurid relations with Europe, in 1439, Niccolò de' Conti published an account of his travels as a Muslim merchant to India and Southeast Asia and, later in 1466–1472, Russian merchant Afanasy Nikitin of Tver travelled to India, which he described in his book A Journey Beyond the Three Seas.

These overland journeys had little immediate effect. The Mongol Empire collapsed almost as quickly as it formed and soon the route to the east became more difficult and dangerous. The Black Death of the 14th century also blocked travel and trade. The rise of the Ottoman Empire further limited the possibilities of European overland trade.

Chinese missions (1405–1433)

The Chinese had wide connections through trade in Asia and had been sailing to Arabia, East Africa, and Egypt since the Tang dynasty (AD 618–907). Between 1405 and 1421, the third Ming emperor Yongle sponsored a series of long range tributary missions in the Indian Ocean under the command of admiral Zheng He (Cheng Ho). As important as they are, these voyages did not result in permanent links to overseas territories because of isolationist policy changes in China ending the voyages and knowledge of them.

A large fleet of new junk ships was prepared for these international diplomatic expeditions. The largest of these junks—that the Chinese termed bao chuan (treasure ships)—may have measured 121 metres (400 feet) stem to stern, and thousands of sailors were involved. The first expedition departed in 1405. At least seven well-documented expeditions were launched, each bigger and more expensive than the last. The fleets visited Arabia, East Africa, India, Malay Archipelago and Thailand (at the time called Siam), exchanging goods along the way. They presented gifts of gold, silver, porcelain and silk; in return, received such novelties as ostriches, zebras, camels, ivory and giraffes. After the emperor's death, Zheng He led a final expedition departing from Nanking in 1431 and returning to Beijing in 1433. It is very likely that this last expedition reached as far as Madagascar. The travels were reported by Ma Huan, a Muslim voyager and translator who accompanied Zheng He on three of the seven expeditions, his account published as the Yingya Shenglan (Overall Survey of the Ocean's Shores) (1433).

The voyages had a significant and lasting effect on the organization of a maritime network, utilizing and creating nodes and conduits in its wake, thereby restructuring international and cross-cultural relationships and exchanges. It was especially impactful as no other polity had exerted naval dominance over all sectors of the Indian Ocean prior to these voyages. The Ming promoted alternative nodes as a strategy to establish control over the network. For instance, due to Chinese involvement, ports such as Malacca (in Southeast Asia), Cochin (on the Malabar Coast), and Malindi (on the Swahili Coast) had grown as key alternatives to other important and established ports. The appearance of the Ming treasure fleet generated and intensified competition among contending polities and rivals, each seeking an alliance with the Ming.

The voyages also brought about the Western Ocean's regional integration and the increase in international circulation of people, ideas, and goods. It also provided a platform for cosmopolitan discourses, which took place in locations such as the ships of the Ming treasure fleet, the Ming capitals of Nanjing as well as Beijing, and the banquet receptions organized by the Ming court for foreign representatives. Diverse groups of people from across the maritime countries congregated, interacted, and traveled together as the Ming treasure fleet sailed from and to Ming China. For the first time in its history, the maritime region from China to Africa was under the dominance of a single imperial power and thereby allowed for the creation of a cosmopolitan space.

These long-distance journeys were not followed up, as the Chinese Ming dynasty retreated in the haijin, a policy of isolationism, having limited maritime trade. Travels were halted abruptly after the emperor's death, as the Chinese lost interest in what they termed barbarian lands, turning inward, and successor emperors felt the expeditions were harmful to the Chinese state; Hongxi Emperor ended further expeditions and Xuande Emperor suppressed much of the information about Zheng He's voyages.

Atlantic Ocean (1419–1507)

From the 8th century until the 15th century, the Republic of Venice and neighboring maritime republics held the monopoly of European trade with the Middle East. The silk and spice trade, involving spices, incense, herbs, drugs and opium, made these Mediterranean city-states phenomenally rich. Spices were among the most expensive and demanded products of the Middle Ages, as they were used in medieval medicine, religious rituals, cosmetics, perfumery, as well as food additives and preservatives. They were all imported from Asia and Africa.

Muslim traders—mainly descendants of Arab sailors from Yemen and Oman—dominated maritime routes throughout the Indian Ocean, tapping source regions in the Far East and shipping for trading emporiums in India, mainly Kozhikode, westward to Ormus in the Persian Gulf and Jeddah in the Red Sea. From there, overland routes led to the Mediterranean coasts. Venetian merchants distributed the goods through Europe until the rise of the Ottoman Empire, that eventually led to the fall of Constantinople in 1453, barring Europeans from important combined-land-sea routes in areas around the Aegean, Bosporus, and Black Sea. The Venetians and other Italian Maritime Republics maintained some, more limited, access to Asian goods, via south-eastern Mediterranean trade, in such ports as Antioch, Acre, and Alexandria.

Forced to reduce their activities in the Black Sea, and at war with Venice, the Genoese had turned to North African trade of wheat, olive oil (valued also as an energy source) and a search for silver and gold. Europeans had a constant deficit in silver and gold, as coin only went one way: out, spent on eastern trade that was now cut off. Several European mines were exhausted, the lack of bullion leading to the development of a complex banking system to manage the risks in trade (the very first state bank, Banco di San Giorgio, was founded in 1407 at Genoa). Sailing also into the ports of Bruges (Flanders) and England, Genoese communities were then established in Portugal, who profited from their enterprise and financial expertise.

European sailing had been primarily close to land cabotage, guided by portolan charts. These charts specified proven ocean routes guided by coastal landmarks: sailors departed from a known point, followed a compass heading, and tried to identify their location by its landmarks. For the first oceanic exploration Western Europeans used the compass, as well as progressive new advances in cartography and astronomy. Arab navigational tools like the astrolabe and quadrant were used for celestial navigation.

Portuguese exploration

In 1297, King Dinis of Portugal took personal interest in exports. In 1317, he made an agreement with Genoese merchant sailor Manuel Pessanha (Pessagno), appointing him first admiral of the Portuguese Navy, with the goal of defending the country against Muslim pirate raids. Outbreaks of bubonic plague led to severe depopulation in the second half of the 14th century: only the sea offered alternatives, with most population settling in fishing and trading coastal areas. Between 1325 and 1357, Afonso IV of Portugal encouraged maritime commerce and ordered the first explorations. The Canary Islands, already known to the Genoese, were claimed as officially discovered under patronage of the Portuguese but in 1344 Castile disputed them, expanding their rivalry into the sea.

To ensure their monopoly on trade, Europeans (beginning with the Portuguese) attempted to install a mediterranean system of trade which used military might and intimidation to divert trade through ports they controlled; there it could be taxed. In 1415, Ceuta was conquered by the Portuguese aiming to control navigation of the African coast. Young prince Henry the Navigator was there and became aware of profit possibilities in the Trans-Saharan trade routes. For centuries slave and gold trade routes linking West Africa with the Mediterranean passed over the Western Sahara Desert, controlled by the Moors of North Africa.

Henry wished to know how far Muslim territories in Africa extended, hoping to bypass them and trade directly with West Africa by sea, find allies in legendary Christian lands to the south like the long-lost Christian kingdom of Prester John and to probe whether it was possible to reach the Indies by sea, the source of the lucrative spice trade. He invested in sponsoring voyages down the coast of Mauritania, gathering a group of merchants, shipowners and stakeholders interested in new sea lanes. Soon the Atlantic islands of Madeira (1419) and the Azores (1427) were reached. In particular, they were discovered by voyages launched by the command of Prince Henry the Navigator. The expedition leader himself, who established settlements on the island of Madeira, was Portuguese explorer João Gonçalves Zarco.

At the time, Europeans did not know what lay beyond Cape Non (Cape Chaunar) on the African coast, and whether it was possible to return once it was crossed. Nautical myths warned of oceanic monsters or an edge of the world, but Prince Henry's navigation challenged such beliefs: starting in 1421, systematic sailing overcame it, reaching the difficult Cape Bojador that in 1434 one of Prince Henry's captains, Gil Eanes, finally passed.

From 1440 onwards, caravels were extensively used for the exploration of the coast of Africa. This was an existing Iberian ship type, used for fishing, commerce and some military purposes. Unlike some other vessels of the time, the caravel had a sternpost mounted rudder (as opposed to a side-mounted steering oar, as was seen, for instance, on the Mediterranean ). It had a shallow draft, which was helpful in exploring unknown coastlines. It had good sailing performance, with a windward ability that was particularly notable by the standards of the time.

For celestial navigation the Portuguese used the ephemerides, which experienced a remarkable diffusion in the 15th century. These were astronomical charts plotting the location of the stars over a distinct period of time. Published in 1496 by the Jewish astronomer, astrologer, and mathematician Abraham Zacuto, the Almanach Perpetuum included some of these tables for the movements of stars. These tables revolutionized navigation, allowing the calculation of latitude. Exact longitude, however, remained elusive, and mariners struggled to determine it for centuries. Using the caravel, systematic exploration continued ever more southerly, advancing on average one degree a year. Senegal and Cape Verde Peninsula were reached in 1445 and in 1446, Álvaro Fernandes pushed on almost as far as present-day Sierra Leone.

In 1453, the Fall of Constantinople to the hands of the Ottomans was a blow to Christendom and the established business relations linking with the east. In 1455, Pope Nicholas V issued the bull Romanus Pontifex reinforcing the previous Dum Diversas (1452), granting all lands and seas discovered beyond Cape Bojador to King Afonso V of Portugal and his successors, as well as trade and conquest against Muslims and pagans, initiating a mare clausum policy in the Atlantic. The king, who had been inquiring of Genoese experts about a seaway to India, commissioned the Fra Mauro world map, which arrived in Lisbon in 1459.

In 1456, Diogo Gomes reached the Cape Verde archipelago. In the next decade several captains at the service of Prince Henry—including the Genoese Antonio da Noli and Venetian Alvise Cadamosto—discovered the remaining islands which were occupied during the 15th century. The Gulf of Guinea would be reached in the 1460s.

Portuguese exploration after Prince Henry 
In 1460, Pedro de Sintra reached Sierra Leone. Prince Henry died in November that year after which, given the meagre revenues, exploration was granted to Lisbon merchant Fernão Gomes in 1469, who in exchange for the monopoly of trade in the Gulf of Guinea had to explore  each year for five years. With his sponsorship, explorers João de Santarém, Pedro Escobar, Lopo Gonçalves, Fernão do Pó, and Pedro de Sintra made it even beyond those goals. They reached the Southern Hemisphere and the islands of the Gulf of Guinea, including São Tomé and Príncipe and Elmina on the Gold Coast in 1471. (In the Southern Hemisphere, they used the Southern Cross as the reference for celestial navigation.) There, in what came to be called the "Gold Coast" in what is today Ghana, a thriving alluvial gold trade was found among the natives and Arab and Berber traders.

In 1478, during the War of the Castilian Succession, near the coast at Elmina was fought a large battle between a Castilian armada of 35 caravels and a Portuguese fleet for hegemony of the Guinea trade (gold, slaves, ivory, and melegueta pepper). The war ended with a Portuguese naval victory followed by the official recognition by the Catholic Monarchs of Portuguese sovereignty over most of the disputed West African territories embodied in the Treaty of Alcáçovas, 1479. This was the first colonial war among European powers.

In 1481, the recently crowned João II decided to build São Jorge da Mina factory. In 1482 the Congo River was explored by Diogo Cão, who in 1486 continued to Cape Cross (modern Namibia).

The next crucial breakthrough was in 1488, when Bartolomeu Dias rounded the southern tip of Africa, which he named "Cape of Storms" (Cabo das Tormentas), anchoring at Mossel Bay and then sailing east as far as the mouth of the Great Fish River, proving that the Indian Ocean was accessible from the Atlantic. Simultaneously Pêro da Covilhã, sent out travelling secretly overland, had reached Ethiopia having collected important information about the Red Sea and Quenia coast, suggesting that a sea route to the Indies would soon be forthcoming. Soon the cape was renamed by King John II of Portugal the "Cape of Good Hope" (Cabo da Boa Esperança), because of the great optimism engendered by the possibility of a sea route to India, proving false the view that had existed since Ptolemy that the Indian Ocean was land-locked.

Based on much later stories of the phantom island known as Bacalao and the carvings on Dighton Rock some have speculated that Portuguese explorer João Vaz Corte-Real discovered Newfoundland in 1473, but the sources cited are considered by mainstream historians to be unreliable and unconvincing.

Spanish exploration: Columbus's landfall in the Americas

Portugal's Iberian rival, Castile, had begun to establish its rule over the Canary Islands, located off the west African coast, in 1402, but then became distracted by internal Iberian politics and the repelling of Islamic invasion attempts and raids through most of the 15th century. Only late in the century, following the unification of the crowns of Castile and Aragon did an emerging modern Spain become fully committed to the search for new trade routes overseas. The Crown of Aragon had been an important maritime potentate in the Mediterranean, controlling territories in eastern Spain, southwestern France, major islands like Sicily, Malta, and the Kingdom of Naples and Sardinia, with mainland possessions as far as Greece. In 1492 the joint rulers conquered the Moorish kingdom of Granada, which had been providing Castile with African goods through tribute, and decided to fund Christopher Columbus's expedition in the hope of bypassing Portugal's monopoly on west African sea routes, to reach "the Indies" (east and south Asia) by travelling west. Twice before, in 1485 and 1488, Columbus had presented the project to king John II of Portugal, who rejected it.

On the evening of 3 August 1492, Columbus departed from Palos de la Frontera with three ships; one larger carrack, Santa María, nicknamed Gallega (the Galician), and two smaller caravels, Pinta (the Painted) and Santa Clara, nicknamed Niña. Columbus first sailed to the Canary Islands, where he restocked for what turned out to be a five-week voyage across the ocean, crossing a section of the Atlantic that became known as the Sargasso Sea.

Land was sighted on 12 October 1492, and Columbus called the island (one of the islands now comprising The Bahamas – but which one is disputed) San Salvador, in what he thought to be the "East Indies". Columbus also explored the northeast coast of Cuba (landed on 28 October) and the northern coast of Hispaniola, by 5 December. He was received by the native cacique Guacanagari, who gave him permission to leave some of his men behind.
 Columbus left 39 men and founded the settlement of La Navidad in what is now Haiti. Before returning to Spain, he kidnapped some ten to twenty-five natives and took them back with him. Only seven or eight of the native 'Indians' arrived in Spain alive, but they made quite an impression on Seville.
On the return, a storm forced him to dock in Lisbon, on 4 March 1493. After a week in Portugal, he set sail for Spain and on 15 March 1493 arrived in Barcelona, where he reported to Queen Isabella and King Ferdinand. Word of his discovery of new lands rapidly spread throughout Europe.

Columbus and other Spanish explorers were initially disappointed with their discoveries—unlike Africa or Asia, the Caribbean islanders had little to trade with the Castilian ships. The islands thus became the focus of colonization efforts. It was not until the continent itself was explored that Spain found the wealth it had sought.

Treaty of Tordesillas (1494)

Shortly after Columbus's return from what would later be called the "West Indies", a division of influence became necessary to avoid conflict between the Spanish and Portuguese. On 4 May 1493, two months after Columbus's arrival, the Catholic Monarchs received a bull (Inter caetera) from Pope Alexander VI stating that all lands west and south of a pole-to-pole line 100 leagues west and south of the Azores or the Cape Verde Islands should belong to Castile and, later, all mainlands and islands then belonging to India. It did not mention Portugal, which could not claim newly discovered lands east of the line.

King John II of Portugal was not pleased with the arrangement, feeling that it gave him far too little land—preventing him from reaching India, his main goal. He then negotiated directly with King Ferdinand and Queen Isabella of Spain to move the line west, and allowing him to claim newly discovered lands east of it.

An agreement was reached in 1494, with the Treaty of Tordesillas that divided the world between the two powers. In this treaty the Portuguese received everything outside Europe east of a line that ran 370 leagues west of the Cape Verde islands (already Portuguese), and the islands discovered by Christopher Columbus on his first voyage (claimed for Castile), named in the treaty as Cipangu and Antilia (Cuba and Hispaniola). This gave them control over Africa, Asia and eastern South America (Brazil). The Spanish (Castile) received everything west of this line. At the time of negotiation, the treaty split the known world of Atlantic islands roughly in half, with the dividing line about halfway between Portuguese Cape Verde and the Spanish discoveries in the Caribbean.

Pedro Álvares Cabral encountered in 1500 what is now known as the Brazilian coast, originally thought to be a large island.  Since it was east of the dividing line, he claimed it for Portugal and this was respected by the Spanish.  Portuguese ships sailed west into the Atlantic to get favourable winds for the journey to India, and this is where Cabral was headed on his journey, in a corridor the treaty was negotiated to protect.  Some suspect the Portuguese had secretly discovered Brazil earlier, and this is why they had the line moved eastward and how Cabral found it, but there is no reliable evidence of this.  Others suspect Duarte Pacheco Pereira secretly discovered Brazil in 1498, but this is not considered credible by mainstream historians.

Later the Spanish territory would prove to include huge areas of the continental mainland of North and South America, though Portuguese-controlled Brazil would expand across the line, and settlements by other European powers ignored the treaty.

The Americas: The New World

Very little of the divided area had actually been seen by Europeans, as it was only divided by a geographical definition rather than control on the ground. Columbus's first voyage in 1492 spurred maritime exploration and, from 1497, a number of explorers headed west.

North America
That year John Cabot, also a commissioned Italian, got letters patent from King Henry VII of England. Sailing from Bristol, probably backed by the local Society of Merchant Venturers, Cabot crossed the Atlantic from a northerly latitude hoping the voyage to the "West Indies" would be shorter and made a landfall somewhere in North America, possibly Newfoundland.
In 1499 João Fernandes Lavrador was licensed by the King of Portugal and together with Pêro de Barcelos they first sighted Labrador, which was granted and named after him. After returning he possibly went to Bristol to sail in the name of England. Nearly at the same time, between 1499 and 1502 brothers Gaspar and Miguel Corte Real explored and named the coasts of Greenland and also Newfoundland. Both explorations are noted in the 1502 Cantino planisphere.

The "True Indies" and Brazil
In 1497, newly crowned King Manuel I of Portugal sent an exploratory fleet eastwards, fulfilling his predecessor's project of finding a route to the Indies. In July 1499, news spread that the Portuguese had reached the "true Indies", as a letter was dispatched by the Portuguese king to the Spanish Catholic Monarchs one day after the celebrated return of the fleet.

The third expedition by Columbus in 1498 was the beginning of the first successful Castilian (Spanish) colonization in the West Indies, on the island of Hispaniola. Despite growing doubts, Columbus refused to accept that he had not reached the Indies. During the voyage he discovered the mouth of the Orinoco River on the north coast of South America (now Venezuela) and thought that the huge quantity of fresh water coming from it could only be from a continental land mass, which he was certain was the Asian mainland.

As shipping between Seville and the West Indies grew, knowledge of the Caribbean islands, Central America and the northern coast of South America grew. One of these Spanish fleets, that of Alonso de Ojeda and Amerigo Vespucci in 1499–1500, reached land at the coast of what is now Guyana, when the two explorers seem to have separated in opposite directions. Vespucci sailed southward, discovering the mouth of the Amazon River in July 1499, and reaching 6°S, in present-day north east Brazil, before turning around.

In the beginning of 1500, Vicente Yáñez Pinzon was blown off course by a storm and reached what is now the northeast coast of Brazil on 26 January 1500, exploring as far south as the present-day state of Pernambuco. His fleet was the first to fully enter the Amazon River estuary which he named Río Santa María de la Mar Dulce (Saint Mary's River of the Freshwater Sea). However, the land was too far east for the Castilians to claim under the Treaty of Tordesillas, but the discovery created Castilian (Spanish) interest, with a second voyage by Pinzon in 1508 (an expedition that coasted the northern coast to the Central American coastal mainland, in search of a passage to the East) and a voyage in 1515–16 by a navigator of the 1508 expedition, Juan Díaz de Solís. The 1515–1516 expedition was spurred on by reports of Portuguese exploration of the region (see below). It ended when de Solís and some of his crew disappeared when exploring a River Plate in a boat, but what it found reignited Spanish interest, and colonization began in 1531.

In April 1500, the second Portuguese India Armada, headed by Pedro Álvares Cabral, with a crew of expert captains, including Bartolomeu Dias and Nicolau Coelho, encountered the Brazilian coast as it swung westward in the Atlantic while performing a large "volta do mar" to avoid becalming in the Gulf of Guinea. On 21 April 1500, a mountain was seen and was named Monte Pascoal, and on 22 April Cabral landed on the coast. On 25 April, the entire fleet sailed into the harbour they named Porto Seguro (Port Secure). Cabral perceived that the new land lay east of the line of Tordesillas, and sent an envoy to Portugal with the discovery in letters, including the letter of Pero Vaz de Caminha. Believing the land to be an island, he named it Ilha de Vera Cruz (Island of the True Cross). Some historians have suggested that the Portuguese may have encountered the South American bulge earlier while sailing the "volta do mar", hence the insistence of John II in moving the line west of Tordesillas in 1494—so his landing in Brazil may not have been an accident; although John's motivation may have just been to claiming new lands in the Atlantic easier. From the east coast, the fleet then turned eastward to resume the journey to the southern tip of Africa and India. Cabral was the first captain to touch four continents, leading the first expedition that connected and united Europe, Africa, the New World, and Asia.

At the invitation of King Manuel I of Portugal, Amerigo Vespucci—a Florentine who had been working for a branch of the Medici Bank in Seville since 1491, fitting oceanic expeditions and travelling twice to The Guianas with Juan de la Cosa in the service of Spain—participated as observer in these exploratory voyages to the east coast of South America. The expeditions became widely known in Europe after two accounts attributed to him, published between 1502 and 1504, suggested that the newly discovered lands were not the Indies but a "New World", the Mundus novus; this is also the Latin title of a contemporary document based on Vespucci letters to Lorenzo di Pierfrancesco de' Medici, which had become widely popular in Europe. It was soon understood that Columbus had not reached Asia but had found a new continent, the Americas. The Americas were named in 1507 by cartographers Martin Waldseemüller and Matthias Ringmann, probably after Amerigo Vespucci.

From 1501 to 1502, one of these Portuguese expeditions, led by Gonçalo Coelho (and/or André Gonçalves or Gaspar de Lemos), sailed south along the coast of South America to the bay of present-day Rio de Janeiro. Amerigo Vespucci's account states that the expedition reached the latitude "South Pole elevation 52° S", in the "cold" latitudes of what is now southern Patagonia (possibly near the Strait), before turning back. Vespucci wrote that they headed toward the southwest and south, following "a long, unbending coastline" (apparently coincident with the southern South American coast). This seems controversial, since he changed part of his description in the subsequent letter, stating a shift, from about 32° S (Southern Brazil), to south-southeast, to open sea; maintaining, however, that they reached 50°/52° S (if it was by his own decision or by D. Manuel's censors who had to pressure him to alter his account, because he had revealed far too much to Lorenzo de' Medici and into the public domain, is unknown).

In 1503, Binot Paulmier de Gonneville, challenging the Portuguese policy of mare clausum, led one of the earliest French Normand and Breton expeditions to Brazil. He intended to sail to the East Indies, but near the Cape of Good Hope his ship was diverted to west by a storm, and landed in the present day state of Santa Catarina (southern Brazil), on 5 January 1504.

From 1511 to 1512, Portuguese captains João de Lisboa and Estevão de Fróis reached the River Plate estuary in present-day Uruguay and Argentina, and went as far south as the present-day Gulf of San Matias at 42°S (recorded in the Newen Zeytung auss Pressilandt meaning "New Tidings from the Land of Brazil"). The expedition reached a cape extending north to south which they called Cape of "Santa Maria" (Punta del Este, keeping the name the Cape nearby); and after 40°S they found a "Cape" or "a point or place extending into the sea", and a "Gulf" (in June and July). Driven away by the Tramontane or north wind, they retraced their course. Also gives the first news of the White King and the "people of the mountains" to the interior (the Inca Empire), and a gift, an ax of silver, obtained from the Charrúa natives on their return ("to the coast or side of Brazil"), and "to West" (along the coast and the River Plate estuary), and offered to King Manuel I. Christopher de Haro, a Flemish of Sephardic origin (one of the financiers of the expedition along with D. Nuno Manuel), who would serve the Spanish Crown after 1516, believed that the navigators had discovered a southern strait to west and Asia.

In 1519, an expedition sent by the Spanish Crown to find a way to Asia was led by the experienced Portuguese navigator Ferdinand Magellan. The fleet explored the rivers and bays as it charted the South American coast until it found a way to the Pacific Ocean through the Strait of Magellan.

From 1524 to 1525, Aleixo Garcia, a Portuguese conquistador (possibly a veteran of the Solís expedition of 1516), led a private expedition of a few shipwrecked Castilian and Portuguese adventurers, that recruited about 2,000 Guaraní Indians. They explored the territories of present-day southern Brazil, Paraguay, and Bolivia, using the native trail network, the Peabiru. They were also the first Europeans to cross the Chaco and reach the outer territories of the Inca Empire on the hills of the Andes, near Sucre.

Indian Ocean (1497–1513)

Vasco da Gama's route to India

Protected from direct Spanish competition by the treaty of Tordesillas, Portuguese eastward exploration and colonization continued apace. Twice, in 1485 and 1488, Portugal officially rejected Genoese Christopher Columbus's idea of reaching India by sailing westwards. They believed that sailing east would require a far shorter journey. Dias's return from the Cape of Good Hope in 1488, and Pêro da Covilhã's travel to Ethiopia overland indicated that the richness of the Indian Ocean was accessible from the Atlantic. A long-overdue expedition was prepared.

In July 1497, a small exploratory fleet of four ships and about 170 men left Lisbon under the command of Vasco da Gama. By December the fleet passed the Great Fish River—where Dias had turned back—and sailed into waters unknown to the Europeans. Sailing into the Indian Ocean, da Gama entered a maritime region that had three different and well-developed trade circuits. The one da Gama encountered connected Mogadishu on the east coast of Africa; Aden, at the tip of the Arabian peninsula; the Persian port of Hormuz; Cambay, in north eastern India; and Calicut, in southeastern India. On 20 May 1498, they arrived at Calicut. The efforts of Vasco da Gama to get favorable trading conditions were hampered by the low value of their goods, compared with the valuable goods traded there. Two years and two days after departure, Gama and a survivor crew of 55 men returned in glory to Portugal as the first ships to sail directly from Europe to India. Da Gama's voyage is romanticized in the Lusiads. An epic poem by fellow discovery era traveler Luís de Camões. The poem is widely regarded as Portugal's greatest literary achievement.

In 1500, a second, larger fleet of thirteen ships and about 1500 men were sent to India. Under command of Pedro Álvares Cabral, they made the first landfall on the Brazilian coast, giving Portugal its claim. Later, in the Indian Ocean, one of Cabral's ships reached Madagascar (1501), which was partly explored by Tristão da Cunha in 1507; Mauritius was discovered in 1507, Socotra occupied in 1506. In the same year Lourenço de Almeida landed in Sri Lanka, the eastern island named "Taprobane" in remote accounts of Alexander the Great's and 4th-century BC Greek geographer Megasthenes. On the Asiatic mainland the first factories (trading-posts) were established at Kochi and Calicut (1501) and then Goa (1510).

The "Spice Islands" and China

The Portuguese continued sailing eastward from India, entering a second existing circuit of the Indian Ocean trade, from Calicut and Quillon in India, to southeast Asia, including Malacca, and Palembang. In 1511, Afonso de Albuquerque conquered Malacca for Portugal, then the center of Asian trade. East of Malacca, Albuquerque sent several diplomatic missions: Duarte Fernandes as the first European envoy to the Kingdom of Siam (modern Thailand).

Learning the location of the so-called "spice islands", heretofore a secret from the Europeans, were the Maluku Islands, mainly the Banda, then the world's only source of nutmeg and cloves. Reaching these was the main purpose for the Portuguese voyages in the Indian Ocean.  Albuquerque sent an expedition led by António de Abreu to Banda (via Java and the Lesser Sunda Islands), where they were the first Europeans to arrive in early 1512, after taking a route through which they also reached first the islands of Buru, Ambon and Seram. From Banda Abreu returned to Malacca, while his vice-captain Francisco Serrão, after a separation forced by a shipwreck and heading north, reached once again Ambon and sank off Ternate, where he obtained a license to build a Portuguese fortress-factory: the Fort of São João Baptista de Ternate, which founded the Portuguese presence in the Malay Archipelago.

In May 1513 Jorge Álvares, one of the Portuguese envoys, reached China. Although he was the first to land on Lintin Island in the Pearl River Delta, it was Rafael Perestrello—a cousin of the famed Christopher Columbus—who became the first European explorer to land on the southern coast of mainland China and trade in Guangzhou in 1516, commanding a Portuguese vessel with crew from a Malaccan junk that had sailed from Malacca. Fernão Pires de Andrade visited Canton in 1517 and opened up trade with China. The Portuguese were defeated by the Chinese in 1521 at the Battle of Tunmen and in 1522 at the Battle of Xicaowan, during which the Chinese captured Portuguese breech-loading swivel guns and reverse engineered the technology, calling them "Folangji" 佛郎機 (Frankish) guns, since the Portuguese were called "Folangji" by the Chinese. After a few decades, hostilities between the Portuguese and Chinese ceased and in 1557 the Chinese allowed the Portuguese to occupy Macau.

To enforce a trade monopoly, Muscat and Hormuz in the Persian Gulf were seized by Afonso de Albuquerque in 1507 and in 1515, respectively. He also entered into diplomatic relations with Persia. In 1513, while trying to conquer Aden, an expedition led by Albuquerque cruised the Red Sea inside the Bab al-Mandab, and sheltered at Kamaran island. In 1521, a force under António Correia conquered Bahrain, ushering in a period of almost eighty years of Portuguese rule of the Gulf archipelago. In the Red Sea, Massawa was the most northerly point frequented by the Portuguese until 1541, when a fleet under Estevão da Gama penetrated as far as Suez.

Pacific Ocean (1513–1529)

Balboa's expedition to the Pacific Ocean
With few resources and using information given by caciques, he journeyed across the Isthmus of Panama with 190 Spaniards, a few native guides, and a pack of dogs.

Using a small brigantine and ten native canoes, they sailed along the coast and made landfalls. On September 6, the expedition was reinforced with 1,000 men, fought several battles, entered a dense jungle, and climbed the mountain range along the Chucunaque River from where this "other sea" could be seen. Balboa went ahead and, before noon September 25, he saw on the horizon an undiscovered sea, becoming the first European to have seen or reached the Pacific from the New World. The expedition descended towards the shore for a short reconnaissance trip, thus becoming the first Europeans to navigate the Pacific Ocean off the coast of the New World. He named the new sea Mar del Sur (South Sea) since they had traveled south to reach it. Balboa's main purpose in the expedition was the search for gold-rich kingdoms. To this end, he crossed through the lands of caciques to the islands, naming the largest one Isla Rica (Rich Island, today known as Isla del Rey). He named the entire group Archipiélago de las Perlas, which they are still known as today.

Subsequent developments to the east
From 1515 to 1516, the Spanish fleet led by Juan Díaz de Solís sailed down the east coast of South America as far as Río de la Plata, which Solís named shortly before he died, while trying to find a passage to the "South Sea".

First circumnavigation

By 1516, several Portuguese navigators conflicting with King Manuel I of Portugal gathered in Seville to serve the newly crowned Charles I of Spain. Among them were explorers Diogo and Duarte Barbosa, Estêvão Gomes, João Serrão and Ferdinand Magellan, cartographers Jorge Reinel and Diogo Ribeiro, cosmographers Francisco and Ruy Faleiro and the Flemish merchant Christopher de Haro. Ferdinand Magellan had sailed in India for Portugal up to 1513, when the Maluku Islands were reached, and had kept contact with Francisco Serrão who was living there. Magellan developed the theory that the Maluku Islands were in the Tordesillas Spanish area, based on studies by Faleiro brothers.

Aware of the efforts of the Spanish to find a route to India by sailing west, Magellan presented his plan to Charles I of Spain. The king and Christopher de Haro financed Magellan's expedition. A fleet was put together, and Spanish navigators such as Juan Sebastián Elcano joined the enterprise. On August 10, 1519, they departed from Seville with a fleet of five ships—the caravel flagship Trinidad under Magellan's command, and carracks San Antonio, Concepcion, Santiago and Victoria. They contained a crew of about 237 European men from several regions, with the goal of reaching the Maluku Islands by travelling west, trying to reclaim it under Spain's economic and political sphere.

The fleet sailed further and further south, avoiding the Portuguese territories in Brazil, and became the first to reach Tierra del Fuego at the tip of the Americas. On October 21, starting in Cape Virgenes, they began an arduous trip through a 373-mile (600 km) long strait that Magellan named Estrecho de Todos los Santos, the modern Strait of Magellan. On November 28, three ships entered the Pacific Ocean—then named Mar Pacífico because of its apparent stillness. The expedition managed to cross the Pacific. Magellan died in the battle of Mactan in the Philippines, leaving the Spaniard Juan Sebastián Elcano the task of completing the voyage, reaching the Spice Islands in 1521. On September 6, 1522 Victoria returned to Spain, thus completing the first circumnavigation of the globe. Of the men who set out on five ships, only 18 completed the circumnavigation and managed to return to Spain in this single vessel led by Elcano. Seventeen others arrived later in Spain: twelve captured by the Portuguese in Cape Verde some weeks earlier, and between 1525 and 1527, and five survivors of the Trinidad. Antonio Pigafetta, a Venetian scholar and traveller who had asked to be on board and become a strict assistant of Magellan, kept an accurate journal that become the main source for much of what we know about this voyage.

This round-the-world voyage gave Spain valuable knowledge of the world and its oceans which later helped in the exploration and settlement of the Philippines. Although this was not a realistic alternative to the Portuguese route around Africa (the Strait of Magellan was too far south, and the Pacific Ocean too vast to cover in a single trip from Spain) successive Spanish expeditions used this information to explore the Pacific Ocean and discovered routes that opened up trade between Acapulco, New Spain (present-day Mexico) and Manila in the Philippines.

Westward and eastward exploration meet

Soon after Magellan's expedition, the Portuguese rushed to seize the surviving crew and built a fort in Ternate. In 1525, Charles I of Spain sent another expedition westward to colonize the Maluku Islands, claiming that they were in his zone of the Treaty of Tordesillas. The fleet of seven ships and 450 men was led by García Jofre de Loaísa and included the most notable Spanish navigators: Juan Sebastián Elcano and Loaísa, who lost their lives then, and the young Andrés de Urdaneta.

Near the Strait of Magellan one of the ships was pushed south by a storm, reaching 56° S, where they thought seeing "earth's end": so Cape Horn was crossed for the first time. The expedition reached the islands with great difficulty, docking at Tidore. The conflict with the Portuguese established in nearby Ternate was inevitable, starting nearly a decade of skirmishes.

As there was not a set eastern limit to the Tordesillas line, both kingdoms organized meetings to resolve the issue. From 1524 to 1529, Portuguese and Spanish experts met at Badajoz-Elvas trying to find the exact location of the antimeridian of Tordesillas, which would divide the world into two equal hemispheres. Each crown appointed three astronomers and cartographers, three pilots, and three mathematicians. Lopo Homem, Portuguese cartographer and cosmographer was on the board, along with cartographer Diogo Ribeiro of the Spanish delegation. The board met several times without reaching an agreement: the knowledge at that time was insufficient for an accurate calculation of longitude, and each group gave the islands to its sovereign. The issue was settled only in 1529, after a long negotiation, with the signing of Treaty of Zaragoza, that attributed the Maluku Islands to Portugal and the Philippines to Spain.

From 1525 to 1528, Portugal sent several expeditions around the Maluku Islands. Gomes de Sequeira and Diogo da Rocha were sent north by the governor of Ternate Jorge de Menezes, being the first Europeans to reach the Caroline Islands, which they named "Islands de Sequeira". In 1526, Jorge de Meneses docked on Biak and Waigeo islands, Papua New Guinea. Based on these explorations stands the theory of Portuguese discovery of Australia, one among several competing theories about the early discovery of Australia, supported by Australian historian Kenneth McIntyre, stating it was discovered by Cristóvão de Mendonça and Gomes de Sequeira.

In 1527, Hernán Cortés fitted out a fleet to find new lands in the "South Sea" (Pacific Ocean), asking his cousin Álvaro de Saavedra Cerón to take charge. On 31 October 1527, Saavedra sailed from New Spain, crossing the Pacific and touring the north of New Guinea, then named Isla de Oro. In October 1528, one of the vessels reached the Maluku Islands. In his attempt to return to New Spain he was diverted by the northeast trade winds, which threw him back, so he tried sailing back down, to the south. He returned to New Guinea and sailed northeast, where he sighted the Marshall Islands and the Admiralty Islands, but again was surprised by the winds, which brought him a third time to the Moluccas. This westbound return route was hard to find, but was eventually discovered by Andrés de Urdaneta in 1565.

Inland Spanish expeditions (1519–1532)
Rumors of undiscovered islands northwest of Hispaniola reached Spain by 1511, ushering King Ferdinand's interest in forestalling further exploration. While the Portuguese were making huge gains in the Indian Ocean, the Spanish invested in exploring inland in search of gold and other valuable resources. The members of these expeditions, the "conquistadors", were not soldiers in an army, but more like soldiers of fortune; they came from a variety of backgrounds including artisans, merchants, clergy, lawyers, lesser nobility and a few freed slaves. They usually supplied their own equipment or were extended credit to purchase it in exchange for a share in profits.  They usually had no professional military training, but a number of them had previous experience on other expeditions.

On the mainland of the Americas, the Spanish encountered indigenous empires that were as large and populous as those in Europe. Through relatively small expeditions of conquistadors, several  alliances were established with local indigenous people. Once sources of wealth were found and the Spanish sovereignty was established, the crown focused on the replication of Spanish institutions of state and church in America. An early key element was the so-called "spiritual conquest" of indigenous people through Christian evangelization.  The initial economy of the newly conquered lands was based on receiving tribute goods and forced labor of the indigenous people through an arrangement with Spanish conquistadors called the encomienda. Once vast deposits of silver were discovered, not only the colonial economies of Mexico and Peru were transformed, but so too was the economy of Spain. Bolstered by global trade networks that included high value crops from the Americas and export of silver, its strong economy helped Spain become a great world power. 

During this time, pandemics of European disease such as smallpox decimated the indigenous populations.

In 1512, to reward Juan Ponce de León for exploring Puerto Rico in 1508, king Ferdinand urged him to seek these new lands. He would become governor of discovered lands, but was to finance himself all exploration. With three ships and about 200 men, Léon set out from Puerto Rico in March 1513. In April they sighted land and named it La Florida—because it was Easter (Florida) season—believing it was an island, becoming credited as the first European to land in the continent. The arrival location has been disputed between St. Augustine, Ponce de León Inlet and Melbourne Beach. They headed south for further exploration and on April 8 encountered a current so strong that it pushed them backwards: this was the first encounter with the Gulf Stream that would soon become the primary route for eastbound ships leaving the Spanish Indies bound for Europe. They explored down the coast reaching Biscayne Bay, Dry Tortugas and then sailing southwest in an attempt to circle Cuba to return, reaching Grand Bahama on July.

Cortés' Mexico and the Aztec Empire

In 1517, Cuba's governor Diego Velázquez de Cuéllar commissioned a fleet under the command of Hernández de Córdoba to explore the Yucatán peninsula. They reached the coast where Mayans invited them to land. They were attacked at night and only a remnant of the crew returned. Velázquez then commissioned another expedition led by his nephew Juan de Grijalva, who sailed south along the coast to Tabasco, part of the Aztec empire.

In 1518, Velázquez gave the mayor of the capital of Cuba, Hernán Cortés, the command of an expedition to secure the interior of Mexico but, due to an old gripe between them, revoked the charter. In February 1519, Cortés went ahead anyway, in an act of open mutiny. With about 11 ships, 500 men, 13 horses and a small number of cannons he landed in Yucatán, in Mayan territory, claiming the land for the Spanish crown. From Trinidad he proceeded to Tabasco and won a battle against the natives. Among the vanquished was Marina (La Malinche), his future mistress, who knew both (Aztec) Nahuatl language and Maya, becoming a valuable interpreter and counsellor. Cortés learned about the wealthy Aztec Empire through La Malinche,

In July, his men took over Veracruz and he placed himself under direct orders of new king Charles I of Spain. There Cortés asked for a meeting with Aztec Emperor Montezuma II, who repeatedly refused. They headed to Tenochtitlan and on the way made alliances with several tribes. In October, accompanied by about 3,000 Tlaxcaltec they marched to Cholula, the second largest city in central Mexico. Either to instill fear upon the Aztecs waiting for him or (as he later claimed) wishing to make an example when he feared native treachery, they massacred thousands of unarmed members of the nobility gathered at the central plaza and partially burned the city.

Arriving in Tenochtitlan with a large army, on November 8 they were peacefully received by Moctezuma II, who deliberately let Cortés enter the heart of the Aztec Empire, hoping to know them better to crush them later. The emperor gave them lavish gifts in gold which enticed them to plunder vast amounts. In his letters to King Charles, Cortés claimed to have learned then that he was considered by the Aztecs to be either an emissary of the feathered serpent god Quetzalcoatl or Quetzalcoatl himself – a belief contested by a few modern historians. But he soon learned that his men on the coast had been attacked, and decided to hostage Moctezuma in his palace, demanding a ransom as tribute to King Charles.

Meanwhile, Velasquez sent another expedition, led by Pánfilo de Narváez, to oppose Cortès, arriving in Mexico in April 1520 with 1,100 men. Cortés left 200 men in Tenochtitlan and took the rest to confront Narvaez, whom he overcame, convincing his men to join him. In Tenochtitlán one of Cortés's lieutenants committed a massacre in the Great Temple, triggering local rebellion. Cortés speedily returned, attempting the support of Moctezuma but the Aztec emperor was killed, possibly stoned by his subjects. The Spanish fled for the Tlaxcaltec during the Noche Triste, where they managed a narrow escape while their back guard was massacred. Much of the treasure looted was lost during this panicked escape. After a battle in Otumba they reached Tlaxcala, having lost 870 men. Having prevailed with the assistance of allies and reinforcements from Cuba, Cortés besieged Tenochtitlán and captured its ruler Cuauhtémoc in August 1521. As the Aztec Empire ended he claimed the city for Spain, renaming it Mexico City.

Pizarro's Peru and the Inca Empire

A first attempt to explore western South America was undertaken in 1522 by Pascual de Andagoya. Native South Americans told him about a gold-rich territory on a river called Pirú. Having reached San Juan River (Colombia), Andagoya fell ill and returned to Panama, where he spread news about "Pirú" as the legendary El Dorado. These, along with the accounts of success of Hernán Cortés, caught the attention of Pizarro.

Francisco Pizarro had accompanied Balboa in the crossing of the Isthmus of Panama. In 1524 he formed a partnership with priest Hernando de Luque and soldier Diego de Almagro to explore the south, agreeing to divide the profits. They dubbed the enterprise the "Empresa del Levante": Pizarro would command, Almagro would provide military and food supplies, and Luque would be in charge of finances and additional provisions.

On 13 September 1524, the first of three expeditions left to conquer Peru with about 80 men and 40 horses. The expedition was a failure, reaching no farther than Colombia before succumbing to bad weather, hunger and skirmishes with hostile locals, where Almagro lost an eye. The place names bestowed along their route, Puerto deseado (desired port), Puerto del hambre (port of hunger) and Puerto quemado (burned port), attest to the difficulties of their journey. Two years later they began a second expedition with reluctant permission from the Governor of Panama. In August 1526, they left with two ships, 160 men and several horses. Upon reaching San Juan River they separated, Pizarro staying to explore the swampy coasts and Almagro sent back for reinforcements. Pizarro's main pilot sailed south and, after crossing the equator, captured a raft from Tumbes. To his surprise, it carried textiles, ceramic and much-desired gold, silver, and emeralds, becoming the central focus of the expedition. Soon Almagro joined with reinforcements and they resumed. After a difficult voyage facing strong winds and currents, they reached Atacames where they found a large native population under Inca rule, but they did not land.

Pizarro remained safe near the coast, while Almagro and Luque went back for reinforcements with proof of the rumoured gold. The new governor outright rejected a third expedition and ordered two ships to bring everyone back to Panama. Almagro and Luque grasped the opportunity to join Pizarro. When they arrived at the Isla de Gallo, Pizarro drew a line in the sand, saying: "There lies Peru with its riches; Here, Panama and its poverty. Choose, each man, what best becomes a brave Castilian." Thirteen men decided to stay and became known as The Famous Thirteen. They headed for La Isla Gorgona, where they remained for seven months before the arrival of provisions.

They decided to sail south and, by April 1528, reached the northwestern Peruvian Tumbes Region and were warmly received by local Tumpis. Two of Pizarro's men reported incredible riches, including gold and silver decorations around the chief's house. They saw for the first time a llama which Pizarro called "little camels". The natives named the Spanish "Children of the Sun" for their fair complexion and brilliant armours. They decided then to return to Panama to prepare a final expedition. Before leaving they sailed south through territories they named such as Cabo Blanco, port of Payta, Sechura, Punta de Aguja, Santa Cruz, and Trujillo, reaching the ninth degree south.

In the spring of 1528 Pizarro sailed for Spain, where he had an interview with king Charles I. The king heard of his expeditions in lands rich in gold and silver and promised to support him. The Capitulación de Toledo authorized Pizarro to proceed with the conquest of Peru. Pizarro was then able to convince many friends and relatives to join: his brothers Hernándo Pizarro, Juan Pizarro, Gonzalo Pizarro and also Francisco de Orellana, who would later explore the Amazon River, as well as his cousin Pedro Pizarro.

Pizarro's third and final expedition left Panama for Peru on 27 December 1530. With three ships and one hundred and eighty men they landed near Ecuador and sailed to Tumbes, finding the place destroyed. They entered the interior and established the first Spanish settlement in Peru, San Miguel de Piura. One of the men returned with an Incan envoy and an invitation for a meeting. Since the last meeting, the Inca had begun a civil war and Atahualpa had been resting in northern Peru following the defeat of his brother Huáscar. After marching for two months, they approached Atahualpa. He refused the Spanish, however, saying he would "be no man's tributary." There were fewer than 200 Spanish to his 80,000 soldiers, but Pizarro attacked and won the Incan army in the Battle of Cajamarca, taking Atahualpa captive at the so-called ransom room. Despite fulfilling his promise of filling one room with gold and two with silver, he was convicted for killing his brother and plotting against Pizarro, and was executed.

In 1533, Pizarro invaded Cuzco with indigenous troops and wrote to King Charles I: "This city is the greatest and the finest ever seen in this country or anywhere in the Indies ... it is so beautiful and has such fine buildings that it would be remarkable even in Spain." After the Spanish had sealed the conquest of Peru, Jauja in fertile Mantaro Valley was established as Peru's provisional capital, but it was too far up in the mountains, and Pizarro founded the city of Lima on 18 January 1535, which Pizarro considered one of the most important acts in his life.

Major new trade routes (1542–1565)

In 1543, three Portuguese traders accidentally became the first Westerners to reach and trade with Japan. According to Fernão Mendes Pinto, who claimed to be in this journey, they arrived at Tanegashima, where the locals were impressed by firearms that would be immediately made by the Japanese on a large scale.

The Spanish conquest of the Philippines was ordered by Philip II of Spain, and Andrés de Urdaneta was the designated commander. Urdaneta agreed to accompany the expedition but refused to command and Miguel López de Legazpi was appointed instead. The expedition set sail on November 1564. After spending some time on the islands, Legazpi sent Urdaneta back to find a better return route. Urdaneta set sail from San Miguel on the island of Cebu on 1 June 1565, but was obliged to sail as far as 38 degrees North latitude to obtain favorable winds.

He reasoned that the trade winds of the Pacific might move in a gyre as the Atlantic winds did. If in the Atlantic, ships made the Volta do mar to pick up winds that would bring them back from Madeira, then, he reasoned, by sailing far to the north before heading east, he would pick up trade winds to bring him back to North America. His hunch paid off, and he hit the coast near Cape Mendocino, California, then followed the coast south. The ship reached the port of Acapulco, on 8 October 1565, having traveled  in 130 days. Fourteen of his crew died; only Urdaneta and Felipe de Salcedo, nephew of López de Legazpi, had strength enough to cast the anchors.

Thus, a cross-Pacific Spanish route was established, between Mexico and the Philippines. For a long time these routes were used by the Manila galleons, thereby creating a trade link joining China, the Americas, and Europe via the combined trans-Pacific and trans-Atlantic routes.

Northern European involvement (1595–17th century)

European nations outside Iberia did not recognize the Treaty of Tordesillas between Portugal and Castile, nor did they recognize Pope Alexander VI's donation of the Spanish finds in the New World. France, the Netherlands and England each had a long maritime tradition and had been engaging in privateering. Despite Iberian protections, the new technologies and maps soon made their way north.

After the marriage of Henry VIII of England and Catherine of Aragon failed to produce a male heir and Henry failed to obtain a papal dispensation to annul his marriage, he broke with the Roman Catholic Church and established himself as head of the Church of England. This added religious conflict to political conflict. When much of The Netherlands became Protestant, it sought political and religious independence from Catholic Spain. In 1568, the Dutch rebelled against the rule of Philip II of Spain leading to the Eighty Years' War. War between England and Spain also broke out. In 1580, Philip II became King of Portugal, as heir to its Crown. Although he ruled Portugal and its empire as separate from the Spanish Empire, the union of the crowns produced a Catholic superpower, which England and the Netherlands challenged.

In the eighty year Dutch war of independence, Philip's troops conquered the important trading cities of Bruges and Ghent. Antwerp, then the most important port in the world, fell in 1585. The Protestant population was given two years to settle affairs before leaving the city. Many settled in Amsterdam. Those were mainly skilled craftsmen, rich merchants of the port cities and refugees that fled religious persecution, particularly Sephardi Jews from Portugal and Spain and, later, the Huguenots from France. The Pilgrim Fathers also spent time there before going to the New World. This mass immigration was an important driving force: a small port in 1585, Amsterdam quickly transformed into one of the most important commercial centres in the world. After the defeat of the Spanish Armada in 1588, there was a huge expansion of maritime trade even though the defeat of the English Armada would confirm the naval supremacy of the Spanish navy over the emergent competitors.

The emergence of Dutch maritime power was swift and remarkable: for years Dutch sailors had participated in Portuguese voyages to the east, as able seafarers and keen mapmakers. In 1592, Cornelis de Houtman was sent by Dutch merchants to Lisbon, to gather as much information as he could about the Spice Islands. In 1595, merchant and explorer Jan Huyghen van Linschoten, having travelled widely in the Indian Ocean at the service of the Portuguese, published a travel report in Amsterdam, the "Reys-gheschrift vande navigatien der Portugaloysers in Orienten" ("Report of a journey through the navigations of the Portuguese in the East"). This included vast directions on how to navigate between Portugal and the East Indies and to Japan. That same year Houtman followed this directions in the Dutch first exploratory travel that discovered a new sea route, sailing directly from Madagascar to Sunda Strait in Indonesia and signing a treaty with the Banten Sultan. Another example of the Netherlands rise in maritime power is their seizure of Malacca from Portugal in 1641, which was led to by a long series of battles between the Dutch and the Portuguese; starting in 1602.

Dutch and British interest, fed on new information, led to a movement of commercial expansion, and the foundation of English (1600), and Dutch (1602) chartered companies. Dutch, French, and English sent ships which flouted the Portuguese monopoly, concentrated mostly on the coastal areas, which proved unable to defend against such a vast and dispersed venture.

Exploring North America

The 1497 English expedition authorized by Henry VII of England was led by Italian Venetian John Cabot (Giovanni Caboto); it was the first of a series of French and English missions exploring North America. Mariners from the Italian peninsula played an important role in early explorations, most especially Genoese mariner Christopher Columbus. With its major conquests of central Mexico and Peru and discoveries of silver, Spain put limited efforts into exploring the northern part of the Americas; its resources were concentrated in Central and South America where more wealth had been found. These other European expeditions were initially motivated by the same idea as Columbus, namely a westerly shortcut to the Asian mainland. After the existence of "another ocean" (the Pacific) was confirmed by Balboa in 1513, there still remained the motivation of potentially finding an oceanic Northwest Passage to Asian trade. This was not discovered until the early twentieth century, but other possibilities were found, although nothing on the scale of the spectacular ones of the Spanish. In the early 17th century colonists from a number of Northern European states began to settle on the east coast of North America. Between 1520 and 1521, the Portuguese João Álvares Fagundes, accompanied by couples of mainland Portugal and the Azores, explored Newfoundland and Nova Scotia (possibly reaching the Bay of Fundy on the Minas Basin), and established a fishing colony on the Cape Breton Island that would last until at least the 1570s or near the end of the century.

In 1524, Italian Giovanni da Verrazzano sailed under the authority of Francis I of France, who was motivated by indignation over the division of the world between Portuguese and Spanish. Verrazzano explored the Atlantic Coast of North America, from South Carolina to Newfoundland, and was the first recorded European to visit what would later become the Virginia Colony and the United States. In the same year Estevão Gomes, a Portuguese cartographer who had sailed in Ferdinand Magellan's fleet, explored Nova Scotia, sailing South through Maine, where he entered what is now New York Harbor, the Hudson River and eventually reached Florida in August 1525. As a result of his expedition, the 1529 Diogo Ribeiro world map outlines the East coast of North America almost perfectly. From 1534 to 1536, French explorer Jacques Cartier, believed to have accompanied Verrazzano to Nova Scotia and Brazil, was the first European to travel inland in North America, describing the Gulf of Saint Lawrence, which he named "The Country of Canadas", after Iroquois names, claiming what is now Canada for Francis I of France.

Europeans explored the Pacific Coast beginning in the mid-16th century. Spaniards Francisco de Ulloa explored the Pacific coast of present-day Mexico including the Gulf of California, proving that Baja California was a peninsula. Despite his report based on first hand information, the myth persisted in Europe that California was an island. His account provided the first recorded use of the name "California". João Rodrigues Cabrilho, a Portuguese navigator sailing for the Spanish Crown, was the first European to set foot in California, landing on September 28, 1542, on the shores of San Diego Bay and claiming California for Spain. He also landed on San Miguel, one of the Channel Islands, and continued as far north as Point Reyes on the mainland. After his death the crew continued exploring as far north as Oregon.

The English privateer Francis Drake sailed along the coast in 1579 north of Cabrillo's landing site while circumnavigating the world. Drake had a long and largely successful career attacking Spanish settlements in the Caribbean islands and the mainland, so that for the English, he was a great hero and fervent Protestant, but for the Spanish he was "a frightening monster." Drake played a major role in the defeat of the Spanish Armada in 1588, but led an armada himself to the Spanish Caribbean that was unsuccessful in dislodging the Spanish. On 5 June 1579, the ship briefly made first landfall at South Cove, Cape Arago, just south of Coos Bay, Oregon, and then sailed south while searching for a suitable harbor to repair his damaged ship. On 17 June, Drake and his crew found a protected cove when they landed on the Pacific coast of what is now Northern California near Point Reyes. While ashore, he claimed the area for Queen Elizabeth I of England as Nova Albion or New Albion. To document and assert his claim, Drake posted an engraved plate of brass to claim sovereignty for Queen Elizabeth and her successors on the throne. Drake's landfalls on the west coast of North America are one small part of his 1577-1580 circumnavigation of the globe, the first captain of his own ship to do so. Drake died in 1596 off the coast of Panama, following injuries from a raid.

From 1609 to 1611, after several voyages on behalf of English merchants to explore a prospective Northeast Passage to India, English mariner Henry Hudson, under the auspices of the Dutch East India Company (VOC), explored the region around present-day New York City, while looking for a western route to Asia. He explored the Hudson River and laid the foundation for Dutch colonization of the region. Hudson's final expedition ranged farther north in search of the Northwest Passage, leading to his discovery of the Hudson Strait and Hudson Bay. After wintering in James Bay, Hudson tried to press on with his voyage in the spring of 1611, but his crew mutinied and they cast him adrift.

Search for a northern route

France, the Netherlands, and England were left without a sea route to Asia, either via Africa or South America. When it became apparent that there was no route through the heart of the Americas, attention turned to the possibility of a passage through northern waters. The desire to establish such a route motivated much of the European exploration of the Arctic coasts of both North America and Russia. In Russia the idea of a possible seaway connecting the Atlantic and the Pacific was first put forward by the diplomat Gerasimov in 1525, although Russian settlers on the coast of the White Sea, the Pomors, had been exploring parts of the route as early as the 11th century.

In 1553, English explorer Hugh Willoughby with chief pilot Richard Chancellor were sent out with three vessels in search of a passage by London's Company of Merchant Adventurers to New Lands. During the voyage across the Barents Sea, Willoughby thought he saw islands to the north, and islands called Willoughby's Land were shown on maps published by Plancius and Mercator into the 1640s. The vessels were separated by "terrible whirlwinds" in the Norwegian Sea and Willoughby sailed into a bay near the present border between Finland and Russia. His ships with the frozen crews, including Captain Willoughby and his journal, were found by Russian fishermen a year later. Richard Chancellor was able to drop anchor in the White Sea and make his way overland to Moscow and Ivan the Terrible's Court, opening trade with Russia and the Company of Merchant Adventurers became the Muscovy Company.

In June 1576, English mariner Martin Frobisher led an expedition consisting of three ships and 35 men to search for a north-west passage around North America. The voyage was supported by the Muscovy Company, the same merchants that hired Hugh Willoughby to find a north-east passage above Russia. Violent storms sank one ship and forced another to turn back but Frobisher and the remaining ship reached the coast of Labrador in July. A few days later they came upon the mouth of what is now Frobisher Bay. Frobisher believed it to be the entrance to a north-west passage and named it Frobisher's Strait and claimed Baffin Island for Queen Elizabeth. After some preliminary exploration, Frobisher returned to England. He commanded two subsequent voyages in 1577 and 1578, but failed to find the hoped-for passage. Frobisher brought to England his ships laden with ore, but it was found to be worthless and damaged his reputation as an explorer. He remains an important early historical figure in Canada.

Barentsz' Arctic exploration

On 5 June 1594, Dutch cartographer Willem Barentsz departed from Texel in a fleet of three ships to enter the Kara Sea, with the hopes of finding the Northeast Passage above Siberia. At Williams Island the crew encountered a polar bear for the first time. They managed to bring it on board, but the bear rampaged and was killed. Barentsz reached the west coast of Novaya Zemlya and followed it northward, before being forced to turn back in the face of large icebergs.

The following year, Prince Maurice of Orange named him chief pilot of a new expedition of six ships, loaded with merchant wares that the Dutch hoped to trade with China. The party came across Samoyed "wild men" but eventually turned back upon discovering the Kara Sea frozen. In 1596, the States-General offered a high reward for anybody who successfully navigated the Northeast Passage. The Town Council of Amsterdam purchased and outfitted two small ships, captained by Jan Rijp and Jacob van Heemskerk, to search for the elusive channel, under the command of Barents. They set off on May, and on June discovered Bear Island and Spitsbergen, sighting its northwest coast. They saw a large bay, later called Raudfjorden and entered Magdalenefjorden, which they named Tusk Bay, sailing into the northern entrance of Forlandsundet, which they called Keerwyck, but were forced to turn back because of a shoal. On 28 June they rounded the northern point of Prins Karls Forland, which they named Vogelhoek, on account of the large number of birds, and sailed south, passing Isfjorden and Bellsund, which were labelled on Barentsz's chart as Grooten Inwyck and Inwyck.

The ships once again reached Bear Island on 1 July, which led to a disagreement. They parted ways, with Barentsz continuing northeast, while Rijp headed north. Barentsz reached Novaya Zemlya and, to avoid becoming entrapped in ice, headed for the Vaigatch Strait but became stuck within the icebergs and floes. Stranded, the 16-man crew was forced to spend the winter on the ice. The crew used lumber from their ship to build a lodge they called Het Behouden Huys (The Kept House). Dealing with extreme cold, they used the merchant fabrics to make additional blankets and clothing and caught Arctic foxes in primitive traps, as well as polar bears. When June arrived, and the ice had still not loosened its grip on the ship, scurvy-ridden survivors took two small boats out into the sea. Barentsz died at sea on 20 June 1597, while studying charts. It took seven more weeks for the boats to reach Kola where they were rescued by a Russian merchant vessel. Only 12 crewmen remained, reaching Amsterdam in November. Two of Barentsz' crewmembers later published their journals, Jan Huyghen van Linschoten, who had accompanied him on the first two voyages, and Gerrit de Veer who had acted as the ship's carpenter on the last.

In 1608, Henry Hudson made a second attempt, trying to go across the top of Russia. He made it to Novaya Zemlya but was forced to turn back. Between 1609 and 1611, Hudson, after several voyages on behalf of English merchants to explore a prospective Northern Sea Route to India, explored the region around modern New York City while looking for a western route to Asia under the auspices of the Dutch East India Company (VOC).

Dutch Australia and New Zealand

Terra Australis Ignota (Latin, "the unknown land of the south") was a hypothetical continent appearing on European maps from the 15th to the 18th centuries, with roots in a notion introduced by Aristotle. It was depicted on the mid-16th-century Dieppe maps, where its coastline appeared just south of the islands of the East Indies; it was often elaborately charted, with a wealth of fictitious detail. The discoveries reduced the area where the continent could be found; however, many cartographers held to Aristotle's opinion, like Gerardus Mercator (1569) and Alexander Dalrymple even so late as 1767 argued for its existence, with such arguments as that there should be a large landmass in the Southern Hemisphere as a counterweight to the known landmasses in the Northern Hemisphere. As new lands were discovered, they were often assumed to be parts of this hypothetical continent.

Juan Fernández, sailing from Chile in 1576, claimed he had discovered the Southern Continent. Luis Váez de Torres, a Galician navigator working for the Spanish Crown, proved the existence of a passage south of New Guinea, now known as Torres Strait. Pedro Fernandes de Queirós, a Portuguese navigator sailing for the Spanish Crown, saw a large island south of New Guinea in 1606, which he named La Australia del Espiritu Santo. He represented this to the King of Spain as the Terra Australis incognita. In fact, it was not Australia but an island in present-day Vanuatu.

Dutch navigator and colonial governor, Willem Janszoon sailed from the Netherlands for the East Indies for the third time on December 18, 1603, as captain of the Duyfken (or Duijfken, meaning "Little Dove"), one of twelve ships of the great fleet of Steven van der Hagen. Once in the Indies, Janszoon was sent to search for other outlets of trade, particularly in "the great land of Nova Guinea and other East and Southlands." On November 18, 1605, the Duyfken sailed from Bantam to the coast of western New Guinea. Janszoon then crossed the eastern end of the Arafura Sea, without seeing the Torres Strait, into the Gulf of Carpentaria. On February 26, 1606, he made landfall at the Pennefather River on the western shore of Cape York in Queensland, near the modern town of Weipa. This is the first recorded European landfall on the Australian continent. In 1615, Jacob le Maire and Willem Schouten's rounding of Cape Horn proved that Tierra del Fuego was a relatively small island.

From 1642 to 1644, Abel Tasman, also a Dutch explorer and merchant in the service of the VOC, circumnavigated New Holland proving that Australia was not part of the mythical southern continent. He was the first known European expedition to reach the islands of Van Diemen's Land (now Tasmania) and New Zealand and to sight the Fiji islands, which he did in 1643. Tasman, his navigator Visscher, and his merchant Gilsemans also mapped substantial portions of Australia, New Zealand, and the Pacific Islands.

Russian exploration of Siberia (1581–1660)

In the mid-16th century, the Tsardom of Russia conquered the Tatar khanates of Kazan and Astrakhan, thus annexing the entire Volga Region and opening the way to the Ural Mountains. The colonization of the new easternmost lands of Russia and further onslaught eastward was led by the rich merchants Stroganovs. Tsar Ivan IV granted vast estates near the Urals as well as tax privileges to Anikey Stroganov, who organized large scale migration to these lands. Stroganovs developed farming, hunting, saltworks, fishing, and ore mining on the Urals and established trade with Siberian tribes.

Conquest of the Khanate of Sibir
Around 1577, Semyon Stroganov and other sons of Anikey Stroganov hired a Cossack leader called Yermak to protect their lands from the attacks of Siberian Khan Kuchum. By 1580, Stroganovs and Yermak came up with the idea of a military expedition to Siberia, in order to fight Kuchum in his own land. In 1581, Yermak began his voyage into the depths of Siberia. After a few victories over the khan's army, Yermak's people defeated the main forces of Kuchum on Irtysh River in a 3-day Battle of Chuvash Cape in 1582. The remains of the khan's army retreated to the steppes, and thus Yermak captured the Siberia Khanate, including its capital Qashliq near modern Tobolsk. Kuchum still was strong and suddenly attacked Yermak in 1585 in the dead of night, killing most of his people. Yermak was wounded and tried to swim across the Wagay River (Irtysh's tributary), but drowned under the weight of his own chain mail. The Cossacks had to withdraw from Siberia completely, but thanks to Yermak's having explored all the main river routes in West Siberia, Russians successfully reclaimed all his conquests just several years later.

Siberian river routes
In the early 17th century, the eastward movement of Russians was slowed by the internal problems in the country during the Time of Troubles. However, very soon the exploration and colonization of the huge territories of Siberia was resumed, led mostly by Cossacks hunting for valuable furs and ivory. While Cossacks came from the Southern Urals, another wave of Russians came by the Arctic Ocean. These were Pomors from the Russian North, who already had been making fur trade with Mangazeya in the north of the Western Siberia for quite a long time. In 1607, the settlement of Turukhansk was founded on the northern Yenisey River, near the mouth of Lower Tunguska. In 1619, Yeniseysk ostrog was founded on the mid-Yenisey at the mouth of the Upper Tunguska.

According to later legendary accounts (folktales collected a century after the fact), Pyanda discovered the Lena. He returned up the Lena until it became too rocky and shallow, and portaged to the Angara River. In this way, Pyanda may have become the first Russian to meet Yakuts and Buryats.

In 1627, Pyotr Beketov was appointed Yenisei voevoda in Siberia. He successfully carried out the voyage to collect taxes from the Zabaykalye Buryats, becoming the first Russian to step in Buryatia. He founded the first Russian settlement there, Rybinsky ostrog. Beketov was sent to the Lena River in 1631, where in 1632 he founded Yakutsk and sent his Cossacks to explore the Aldan River and farther down the Lena, to found new fortresses, and to collect taxes.

Yakutsk soon turned into a major starting point for further Russian expeditions eastward, southward and northward. Maksim Perfilyev, who earlier had been one of the founders of Yeniseysk, founded Bratsk ostrog on the Angara in 1631. In 1638, Perfilyev became the first Russian to step into Transbaikalia, travelling there from Yakutsk.

In 1643, Kurbat Ivanov led a group of Cossacks from Yakutsk to the south of the Baikal Mountains and discovered Lake Baikal, visiting its Olkhon Island. Ivanov later made the first chart and description of Baikal.

Russians reach the Pacific
In 1639, a group of explorers led by Ivan Moskvitin became the first Russians to reach the Pacific Ocean and to discover the Sea of Okhotsk, having built a winter camp on its shore at the Ulya River mouth. The Cossacks learned from the locals about the large Amur River far to the south. In 1640, they apparently sailed south, explored the south-eastern shores of the Okhotsk Sea, perhaps reaching the mouth of the Amur River and possibly discovering the Shantar Islands on their way back. Based on Moskvitin's account, Kurbat Ivanov drew the first Russian map of the Far East in 1642.

In 1643, Vasily Poyarkov crossed the Stanovoy Range and reached the upper Zeya River in the country of the Daurs, who were paying tribute to the Manchu Chinese. After wintering, in 1644, Poyarkov pushed down the Zeya and became the first Russian to reach the Amur River. He sailed down the Amur and finally discovered the mouth of that great river from land. Since his Cossacks provoked the enmity of the locals behind, Poyarkov chose a different way back. They built boats and in 1645, sailed along the Sea of Okhotsk coast to the Ulya River and spent the next winter in the huts that had been built by Ivan Moskvitin six years earlier. In 1646, they returned to Yakutsk.

In 1644, Mikhail Stadukhin discovered the Kolyma River and founded Srednekolymsk. A merchant named Fedot Alekseyev Popov organized a further expedition eastward, and Semyon Dezhnyov became a captain of one of the kochi. In 1648, they sailed from Srednekolymsk down to the Arctic and after some time they rounded Cape Dezhnyov, thus becoming the first explorers to pass through the Bering Strait and to discover Chukotka and the Bering Sea. All their kochi and most of their men (including Popov himself) were lost in storms and clashes with the natives. A small group led by Dezhnyov reached the mouth of the Anadyr River and sailed up it in 1649, having built new boats from the wreckage. They founded Anadyrsk and were stranded there, until Stadukhin found them, coming from Kolyma by land. Subsequently, Stadukhin set off south in 1651 and discovered Penzhin Bay on the northern coast of the Okhotsk Sea. He also may have explored the western shores of Kamchatka.

From 1649 to 1650, Yerofey Khabarov became the second Russian to explore the Amur River. Through Olyokma, Tungir and Shilka Rivers he reached Amur (Dauria), returned to Yakutsk and then back to Amur with a larger force in 1650–1653. This time he was met with armed resistance. He built winter quarters at Albazin, then sailed down Amur and found Achansk, which preceded the present-day Khabarovsk, defeating or evading large armies of Daurian Manchu Chinese and Koreans on his way. He charted the Amur in his Draft of the Amur river. Subsequently, Russians held on to the Amur region until 1689, when by the Treaty of Nerchinsk this land was assigned to the Chinese Empire (it was returned, however, by the Treaty of Aigun in 1858).

From 1659 to 1665, Kurbat Ivanov was the next head of Anadyrsky ostrog after Semyon Dezhnev. In 1660, he sailed from Anadyr Bay to Cape Dezhnyov. Atop his earlier pioneering charts, Ivanov is credited with creation of the early map of Chukotka and Bering Strait, which was the first to show on paper (very schematically) the yet undiscovered Wrangel Island, both Diomede Islands and Alaska, based on the data collected from the natives of Chukotka.

By the mid-17th century, Russians established the borders of their country close to modern ones, and explored almost the whole of Siberia, except the eastern Kamchatka and some regions north of the Arctic Circle. The conquest of Kamchatka later would be achieved in the early 1700s by Vladimir Atlasov, while the discovery of the Arctic coastline and Alaska would be completed by the Great Northern Expedition in 1733–1743.

Global impact

European overseas expansion led to the contact between the Old and New Worlds producing the Columbian exchange. It started the global silver trade and led to direct European involvement the Chinese porcelain trade. It involved the transfer of goods unique to one hemisphere to another. Europeans brought cattle, horses, and sheep to the New World, and from the New World Europeans received tobacco, potatoes, tomatoes, and maize. Other items and commodities becoming important in global trade were the tobacco, sugarcane, and cotton crops of the Americas, along with the gold and silver brought from the American continent not only to Europe but elsewhere in the Old World.

The formation of new trans-oceanic links and subsequent expansion of European influence led to the Age of Imperialism, a historical period which began during the Age of Discovery during which colonial powers from Europe gradually colonized most territory on the planet. European demand for trade, commodities, colonies and slaves had a drastic impact on the rest of the world; during Europe's colonization of the Americas, European colonial powers conquered and colonized numerous indigenous nations and cultures, and conducted numerous forced conversions and attempts at forcible cultural assimilation. Combined with the introduction of infectious diseases from Europe, these events led to a drastic decrease of the indigenous American population. Indigenous accounts of European colonization were summarized by scholar Peter C. Mancall as such: "the arrival of Europeans brought death, displacement, sorrow, and despair to Native Americans". In some areas, like North America, Central America, Australia, New Zealand, and Argentina, indigenous peoples were badly treated, driven off their lands, and reduced to dependent minorities in the territory.

Similarly, in West Africa and East Africa, local states supplied the appetite of European slave traders, changing the complexion of coastal African states and fundamentally altering the nature of slavery in Africa, causing impacts on societies and economies deep inland.

In North America, there were many conflicts between Europeans and indigenous peoples. The Europeans had many advantages over the Indigenous people. Introduced Eurasian diseases wiped out 50–90% of the indigenous population because they had not been exposed to them before and lacked acquired immunity.

Maize and manioc were introduced into Africa in the 16th century by the Portuguese. They are now important staple foods, replacing native African crops. Alfred W. Crosby speculated that increased production of maize, manioc, and other New World crops led to heavier concentrations of population in the areas from which slavers captured their victims.

In the global silver trade, the Ming dynasty was stimulated by trade with the Portuguese, Spanish, and Dutch. Although global, much of that silver ended up in the hands of the Chinese and China dominated silver imports. Between 1600 and 1800 China received 100 tons of silver on average per year. A large populace near the Lower Yangzte averaged a hundreds of taels of silver per household in the late 16th century. Altogether, more than 150,000 tons of silver were shipped from Potosí by the end of the 18th century. From 1500 to 1800, Mexico and Peru produced about 80% of the world's silver with more than 30% of it eventually ending up in China (largely because of European merchants who used it to purchase exotic Chinese commodities). In the late 16th and early 17th century, Japan was also exporting heavily into China and the foreign trade at large. Trade with European powers and the Japanese brought in massive amounts of silver, which then replaced copper and paper banknotes as the common medium of exchange in China. During the last decades of the Ming the flow of silver into China was greatly diminished, thereby undermining state revenues and indeed the entire Ming economy. This damage to the economy was compounded by the effects on agriculture of the incipient Little Ice Age, natural calamities, crop failure, and sudden epidemics. The ensuing breakdown of authority and people's livelihoods allowed rebel leaders such as Li Zicheng to challenge Ming authority.

New crops that had come to Asia from the Americas via the Spanish colonizers in the 16th century contributed to the Asia's population growth. Although the bulk of imports to China were silver, the Chinese also purchased New World crops from the Spanish Empire. This included sweet potatoes, maize, and peanuts, foods that could be cultivated in lands where traditional Chinese staple crops—wheat, millet, and rice—could not grow, hence facilitating a rise in the population of China. In the Song dynasty (960–1279), rice had become the major staple crop of the poor; after sweet potatoes were introduced to China around 1560, it gradually became the traditional food of the lower classes.

The arrival of the Portuguese to Japan in 1543 initiated the Nanban trade period, with the Japanese adopting several technologies and cultural practices, like the arquebus, European-style cuirasses, European ships, Christianity, decorative art, and language. After the Chinese had banned direct trade by Chinese merchants with Japan, the Portuguese filled this commercial vacuum as intermediaries between China and Japan. The Portuguese bought Chinese silk and sold it to the Japanese in return for Japanese-mined silver; since silver was more highly valued in China, the Portuguese could then use Japanese silver to buy even larger stocks of Chinese silk. However, by 1573—after the Spanish established a trading base in Manila—the Portuguese intermediary trade was trumped by the prime source of incoming silver to China from the Spanish Americas. Although China acted as the cog running the wheel of global trade during the 16th to 18th centuries, Japan's huge contribution of silver exports to China were critical to the world economy and China's liquidity and success with the commodity.

Italian Jesuit Matteo Ricci (1552–1610) was the first European allowed into the Forbidden City. He taught the Chinese how to construct and play the spinet, translated Chinese texts into Latin and vice versa, and worked closely with his Chinese associate Xu Guangqi (1562–1633) on mathematical work.

Economic impact in Europe

As a wider variety of global luxury commodities entered the European markets by sea, previous European markets for luxury goods stagnated. The Atlantic trade largely supplanted pre-existing Italian and German trading powers which had relied on their Baltic, Russian, and Islamic trade links. The new commodities also caused social change, as sugar, spices, silks and chinawares entered the luxury markets of Europe.

The European economic centre shifted from the Mediterranean to Western Europe. The city of Antwerp, part of the Duchy of Brabant, became "the centre of the entire international economy", and the richest city in Europe at this time. Centred in Antwerp first and then in Amsterdam, "Dutch Golden Age" was tightly linked to the Age of Discovery. Francesco Guicciardini, a Venetian envoy, stated that hundreds of ships would pass Antwerp in a day, and 2,000 carts entered the city each week. Portuguese ships laden with pepper and cinnamon would unload their cargo. With many foreign merchants resident in the city and governed by an oligarchy of banker-aristocrats forbidden to engage in trade, the economy of Antwerp was foreigner-controlled, which made the city very international, with merchants and traders from Venice, Ragusa, Spain, and Portugal and a policy of toleration, which attracted a large Orthodox Jewish community. The city experienced three booms during its golden age, the first based on the pepper market, a second launched by New World silver coming from Seville (ending with the bankruptcy of Spain in 1557), and a third boom, after the Treaty of Cateau-Cambresis, in 1559, based on the textiles industry.

Despite initial hostilities, by 1549 the Portuguese were sending annual trade missions to Shangchuan Island in China. In 1557 they managed to convince the Ming court to agree on a legal port treaty that would establish Macau as an official Portuguese trade colony. The Portuguese friar Gaspar da Cruz (c. 1520 February 5, 1570) wrote the first complete book on China and the Ming dynasty that was published in Europe; it included information on its geography, provinces, royalty, official class, bureaucracy, shipping, architecture, farming, craftsmanship, merchant affairs, clothing, religious and social customs, music and instruments, writing, education, and justice.

From China the major exports were silk and porcelain, adapted to meet European tastes. The Chinese export porcelains were held in such great esteem in Europe that, in English, china became a commonly-used synonym for porcelain. Kraak porcelain (believed to be named after the Portuguese carracks in which it was transported) was among the first Chinese ware to arrive in Europe in mass quantities. Only the richest could afford these early imports, and Kraak often featured in Dutch still life paintings. Soon the Dutch East India Company established a lively trade with the East, having imported 6 million porcelain items from China to Europe between the years 1602 to 1682. The Chinese workmanship impressed many. Between 1575 and 1587 Medici porcelain from Florence was the first successful attempt to imitate Chinese porcelain. Although Dutch potters did not immediately imitate Chinese porcelain, they began to do it when the supply to Europe was interrupted, after the death of Wanli Emperor in 1620. Kraak, mainly the blue and white porcelain, was imitated all over the world by potters in Arita, Japan and Persia—where Dutch merchants turned when the fall of the Ming dynasty rendered Chinese originals unavailable—and ultimately in Delftware. Dutch and later English Delftware inspired by Chinese designs persisted from about 1630 to the mid-18th century alongside European patterns.

Antonio de Morga (1559–1636), a Spanish official in Manila, listed an extensive inventory of goods that were traded by Ming China at the turn of the 16th to 17th century, noting there were "rarities which, did I refer to them all, I would never finish, nor have sufficient paper for it". After noting the variety of silk goods traded to Europeans, Ebrey writes of the considerable size of commercial transactions: In one case a galleon to the Spanish territories in the New World carried over 50,000 pairs of silk stockings. In return China imported mostly silver from Peruvian and Mexican mines, transported via Manila. Chinese merchants were active in these trading ventures, and many emigrated to such places as the Philippines and Borneo to take advantage of the new commercial opportunities.

The increase in gold and silver experienced by Spain coincided with a major inflationary cycle both within Spain and Europe, known as the price revolution. Spain had amassed large quantities of gold and silver from the New World. In the 1540s large scale extraction of silver from Mexico's Guanajuato began. With the opening of the silver mines in Zacatecas and Bolivia's Potosí in 1546 large shipments of silver became the fabled source of wealth. During the 16th century, Spain held the equivalent of US$1.5 trillion (1990 terms) in gold and silver from New Spain. Being the most powerful European monarch at a time full of war and religious conflicts, the Habsburg rulers spent the wealth in wars and arts across Europe. "I learnt a proverb here", said a French traveller in 1603: "Everything is dear in Spain except silver". The spent silver, suddenly spread throughout a previously cash-starved Europe, caused widespread inflation. The inflation was worsened by a growing population with a static production level, low salaries and a rising cost of living, which damaged local industry. Increasingly, Spain became dependent on the revenues flowing in from the mercantile empire in the Americas, leading to Spain's first bankruptcy in 1557 due to rising military costs. Philip II of Spain defaulted on debt payments in 1557, 1560, 1575, and 1596. The increase in prices as a result of currency circulation fuelled the growth of the commercial middle class in Europe, the bourgeoisie, which came to influence the politics and culture of many countries.

One effect of the inflation, particularly in Great Britain, was that tenant farmers who held long-term leases from lords saw real decreases in rent. Some lords opted to sell their leased land, giving rise to small land-owing farmers such as yeoman and gentlemen farmers.

See also

 Atlantic slave trade
 Catholic Church and the Age of Discovery
 Chinese maritime exploration
 Chronology of European exploration of Asia
 Columbian Exchange
 Exploration
 Exploration of North America
 European colonization of the Americas
 European exploration of Australia
 Heroic Age of Antarctic Exploration
 History of navigation
 L'Anse aux Meadows
 List of explorations
 Major explorations after the Age of Discovery
 Maritime history
 Portuguese inventions
 Pre-Columbian trans-oceanic contact
 Scramble for Africa
 Timeline of European exploration
 Timeline of maritime migration and exploration
 Winds in the Age of Sail

Footnotes

References

Bibliography

Primary sources

Secondary works

Web sources

Further reading

External links

 "The Faustian Impulse and European Exploration" at The Fortnightly Review
 [https://www.zinned

 
Exploration
History of European colonialism
European colonization of the Americas
European colonisation in Asia
European colonisation in Oceania
Historical eras
History of Europe
History of geography
Maritime history
.
.
.
.
.
15th century in international relations
16th century in international relations
17th century in international relations
18th century in international relations
Portuguese colonization of the Americas
Spanish colonization of the Americas